The 2015 Scottish Women's Premier League (SWPL) was the fourteenth season of the Scottish Women's Premier League, the highest division of women's football in Scotland since its inception in 2002.

A total of twelve teams contested the league. Glasgow City were the reigning champions.

The SWPL continued in the format applied since 2012. The 12 clubs faced each other once (11 games per club), after which the league split into top six and bottom six sections based on league position. Each club then played home and away against clubs in their respective sections to give a total of 21 games.

For the first time two Scottish teams qualify for the UEFA Women's Champions League. That was because of an expanded entry list starting from 2016–17.

Format
Like in the previous season, the teams played each other once. After that the top and bottom six split. Teams in both groups then played each other twice more, for a combined total of 21 games. Points of both rounds were added.

In 2016 the Premier League consisted of two levels of eight teams. The top eight finishers qualified for the SPPL 1, the last four placed teams and the four best placed teams of the first division formed the SPWL 2.

Teams
Falkirk LFC partnered with Stirling University and now compete under their name.

League standings 
After 12 games the top two clubs, Glasgow City and Hibernian had moved 12 points clear of third placed Aberdeen. Both newly promoted teams also had a good first half, leading the relegation group after 12 matches. In the second half of the season Hearts were overtaken by Forfar Farmington and didn't make the new reduced Premier League. The two Champions League places were taken by Glasgow City and Hibernian three match days before the end.

Results

1st stage

Final stage

Championship group

Relegation group

References

External links
Season at soccerway.com
Season at shekicks.net

1
Scot
Scot
Scottish Women's Premier League seasons